The Louisiana Sports Hall of Fame & Northwest Louisiana History Museum, located in Natchitoches, Louisiana, is a branch of the Louisiana State Museum.  

The Louisiana Sports Hall of Fame is dedicated to the history of sports in Louisiana, including the achievements of over 300 Louisiana athletes, coaches and other sports figures. 

The Northwest Louisiana History Museum examines the area's cultural traditions and history from early native-American civilizations to the present. 

The museum opened in 2013 in a new facility located on Cane River Lake. Built for $23 million, the building was designed by the firm of Trahan Architects of New Orleans and features sinuous molded stone interiors and earth-colored exterior sheathing in order to evoke the river.

History
The Louisiana Sports Hall of Fame was first founded by the Louisiana Sports Writers Association in 1958, but it did not have a physical structure until the city Natchitoches and Northwestern State University addressed the issue in 1971 with an offer of space on the campus. The growing archive of memorabilia was shelved in Prather Coliseum for 40 years until the opening of the new $23 million Hall of Fame on June 28, 2013.

See also
North Louisiana Historical Association

References

Stahls, Paul F., Jr. "Honoring Athletes at the Louisiana Sports Hall of Fame," Louisiana Life. Sept.–Oct. 2013.

External links
 Louisiana Sports Hall of Fame & Northwest Louisiana History Museum - official site
 Louisiana Sports Hall of Fame website
 Louisiana Sports Hall of Fame- Facebook page

Museums in Natchitoches Parish, Louisiana
Buildings and structures in Natchitoches, Louisiana
State sports halls of fame in the United States
History museums in Louisiana
Louisiana State Museum
Halls of fame in Louisiana
All-sports halls of fame
1971 establishments in Louisiana
Awards established in 1971